CybExer Technologies is an Estonian cybersecurity company, founded in 2016.

In 2018, the company was one of the ten companies listed as a category winner at the NATO Communications and Information Agency (NCIA) Defence Innovation Challenge.

In 2020, the NATO Support and Procurement Agency signed a three-year contract with CybExer Technologies to develop a cybersecurity training ground for the Luxembourg Directorate of Defense. The company also provides cyber security training to Ukrainian police cadets.

References

External links
 

Information technology companies of Estonia.